Pay Takht may refer to:

 Pay Takht-e Varzard
 Pay Takht-e Zal